Videoton may refer to:
Videoton (company), Hungarian electronics company
Fehérvár FC, formerly known as Videoton FC, Hungarian football club

See also
Vidéotron, a Canadian telecommunications company